Barka, Barca or Barqa or Barkah may refer to:

Places
 Barca (ancient city), in eastern Libya.
 El Barka, a village in Tamanrasset Province, Algeria
 Barka, Divača, a village in Slovenia
 Barka (Eritrea), a former province of Eritrea
 Barka, Oman, a town in Oman
 Barka, Saudi Arabia, a village in Saudi Arabia
 Barka, Pomeranian Voivodeship (north Poland)
 Barka River, a river in Eritrea and Sudan
 Barkah, Afghanistan, a village in north eastern Afghanistan
 Barkah, Iran, a village in Razavi Khorasan Province, Iran
 Barqa, Gaza, a Palestinian village depopulated in 1948
 Cyrenaica, a region comprising most of eastern Libya, which is named Barqa in Arabic

People
 Barca or Barcas, the cognomen of a Carthaginian dynasty, see Barcid
 Barka Vasyl (1908–2003), Ukrainian writer
 Mehdi Ben Barka (1920–1965), Moroccan politician

Other uses 
 "Lord, You Have Come to the Lakeshore", 1974 Spanish religious song, in Polish "Barka"
 Barça, nickname of Spanish association football club FC Barcelona

See also
Barkaa, Australian rapper and musician